Khlong San is one of the 50 districts (khet) of Bangkok, Thailand. On the west bank of Chao Phraya River, its neighboring districts across the river are (from north clockwise) Phra Nakhon, Samphanthawong, Bang Rak, Sathon, and Bang Kho Laem. On the west side of the river, the only land neighbor is Thon Buri district.

History

Khlong San is one of the oldest districts of Bangkok with a long history. Its name comes from the name of a khlong (คลอง; lit: canal) that runs through the area, "Khlong San" or "Khlong Prasan". Its starting from Chao Phraya River towards Khlong Somdet Chao Phraya Ong Noi at the front of Wat Phichai Yat connect with various canals such as Khlong Wat Thong Thammachat, Khlong  Wat Thong Nopphakhun, Khlong Lat Ya, all of which are canals that flow through the various orchards of the locals, which is the most famous fruit of Khlong San is longkong (a type of langsat). But about 70–80 years ago, there were excavations in various canals to build a road such as Lat Ya, Prajadhipok, Khlong San Roads or now's Somdet Chao Phraya Road.

Khlong San was called, in chronological order, Amphoe Bang Lamphu Lang (บางลำภูล่าง), Amphoe Buppharam (บุปผาราม), and Amphoe Khlong San (since 1916) when it was part of Thonburi Province. Its status was changed to king amphoe in 1938 and back to amphoe again in 1957 due to population changes. It became part of Bangkok after the merging of Thonburi and Phra Nakhon Provinces in 1971.

Khlong San was originally the terminus of the Maeklong Railway, but the line was cut back to Wongwian Yai in 1961 to ease traffic congestion.

Administration
The district is divided into four sub-districts (khwaeng).

Places

 King Taksin Monument and Wongwian Yai (วงเวียนใหญ่)
 Wat Anongkharam (วัดอนงคาราม)
 Wat Sawettachat (วัดเศวตฉัตร)
 Wat Phichai Yat (วัดพิชัยญาติ)
 Wat Thong Thammachat (วัดทองธรรมชาติ)
 Wat Thong Nopphakhun (วัดทองนพคุณ)
 PLATF@RM (แพลตฟอร์ม)
 Princess Mother Memorial Park (อุทยานสมเด็จพระศรีนครินทร์) and Thang Nguan Hah Vintage House (เก๋งจีนทั้งง่วนฮะ) with Guan Yu Shrine (ศาลเจ้ากวนอู)
 Wang Li House (บ้านหวั่งหลี) and Lhong 1919 (ล้ง 1919) with Mazu Shrine (ศาลเจ้าแม่ทับทิมคลองสาน)
 Tha Din Daeng (ท่าดินแดง)
 Pong Patchamit Fort (ป้อมป้องปัจจามิตร)
 ICONSIAM (ไอคอนสยาม)
 Sinn Sathorn Tower (สินสาธรทาวเวอร์)

Transportation
 Wongwian Yai is a major bus hub on the west side of the Chao Phraya River.
 The district is served by Bangkok Skytrain stations: Krung Thonburi and Wongwian Yai.

Health 

 Taksin Hospital, Bangkok Metropolitan Administration
 Somdet Chaopraya Institute of Psychiatry, Department of Mental Health, Ministry of Public Health

Notable people
Srinagarindra – mother of King Ananda Mahidol (Rama VIII) and King Bhumibol Adulyadej (Rama IX)

Gallery
Iconsiam, one of the largest shopping mall near Chao Phraya river.

References

External links
 BMA website with landmarks of Khlong San
 Khlong San district office (Thai)

 
Districts of Bangkok